Francesco Romano may refer to:
 Francesco Romano (footballer) (born 1960), Italian footballer
 Francesco Romano (cyclist) (born 1997), Italian racing cyclist
 Francesco Saverio Romano (born 1964), Italian politician
 Francesco Romano (born 1946), musician with Franco IV e Franco I